Wolves Cry Under the Moon is a 1997 Taiwanese road movie directed by Ho Ping, written by Kuo Cheng and Ho Ping. The story is based on 4 short stories by Kuo Cheng.

Plot 
The overall story is based on Kuo Cheng's 1993 short story "Highway Closing" (國道封閉, also the film's Chinese title).

Sub-plot 1: "The Journey of the Wolf" 
Based on Kuo Cheng's 1991 short story "The Journey of the Wolf" (狼行千里), which has been translated into English by Susan Wilf.
 Tou Chung-hua
 Ku Pao-ming

Sub-plot 2: "Driving on the Road" 
Based on Kuo Cheng's 1988 short story "Driving on the Road" (開車上路).
 Chang Shih
 Yue Hong

Sub-plot 3: "The Heart Thief" 
Based on Kuo Cheng's 1997 short story "The Heart Thief" (偷心賊).
 Annie Yi
 Jerry Huang (voice)

References

External links 
 
 

1997 films
1997 drama films
Films with screenplays by Kuo Cheng
Taiwanese drama films
Films directed by Ho Ping